Kamel Abboud (born 30 September 1961) is an Algerian boxer. He competed in the 1984 Summer Olympics in the men's welterweight division. He tied for ninth place with seven other competitors.

Early life 
Kamel trained at the Béjaïa boxing school, considered to be the best at the national level at the time he was training.

Significant Competitions 
He won the gold medal in the lightweight division at the 1979 African Boxing Championship.

He competed in the welterweight division at the 1981 CISM Championships held at Camp Lejeune in Jacksonville, North Carolina. He lost to Tim Christensen (USA) in the quarter-finals.

References

1961 births
Living people
Boxers at the 1984 Summer Olympics
Algerian male boxers
Olympic boxers of Algeria
Competitors at the 1979 Mediterranean Games
Mediterranean Games bronze medalists for Algeria
Mediterranean Games medalists in boxing
Welterweight boxers
21st-century Algerian people
20th-century Algerian people